Shacknews (originally Quakeholio, then ShugaShack) is a website that hosts news, features, editorial content and forums relating to computer games and console games. It is owned by a company called Gamerhub Content Network, which purchased the site in January 2014.

History
Shacknews was founded in 1996 by Steve "Scary" Gibson, 20 years old at the time, as a website dedicated to following news about the then-upcoming game Quake from id Software. The original name of the website was "Quakeholio". Through the years, the website evolved to cover more than just Quake, and the name was changed. "Shugashack" was chosen after a discussion with friends about the general direction of the page and content. After a few years of frequent spelling confusion and interpreting the name as that of a pornographic website, the site was renamed "Shacknews".

FileShack, a site for game demos, patches, videos, and miscellaneous game-related files for Shacknews users and others, was launched in August 2002.

Shacknews and FileShack reach millions of gamers each month with the daily work of a staff of full-time employees in Waldwick, New Jersey. Shacknews syndicates its content to GameFly and Steam.

The news on the front page of the site is normally separated into several categories for organizational purposes. While for much of the site's history, little original research was involved in Shacknews content, in recent years, main news items have steered away from the "link-and-quote" news method. Currently, Shacknews relies heavily on internally researched news, in-house feature content, and industry event coverage.

In addition to normal news posts, which allow focused discussion of an article's featured topic, there are twice-daily community posts. These posts have had titles including Evening Reading, First Post, werd, Morning Discussion, as well as various other one-off titles. Typically, these posts will feature some noteworthy or interesting news links; however, the major function of these posts is to allow for a "free-for-all" discussion in the post's comment section. These posts are where the majority of the Shacknews community congregate to converse with one another, as well as the site staff.

On February 3, 2009, Shacknews and all related Shacknews destinations were purchased by GameFly.

In January 2014, Shacknews was acquired by Gamerhub Content Network, and the sister site FileShack shut down. Asif Khan, a financial analyst, had been part of purchasing the site from Gamefly near the end of 2013 and became the site's CEO. Khan felt that the changes that Gamefly had made after 2009 had weakened the site's long-standing reputation, losing viewership to other video game industry websites, and wanted to bring it back to where it had been prior to 2009.

Since 2014, David L. Craddock, one of the site's editors and a historian within the video game field, has published several Long Reads on Shacknews on the development of some of the core games in the field based on interviews with people involved in their development, publishing, and marketing. Some of these have been published as ebooks and physical books with editing assistance from Khan.

Comment system

The Shacknews comment system lies at the heart of the Shacknews user community. There have been three major versions of the comment system, which all utilized custom systems programmed for the site. Each comment system has allowed Shacknews users to add comments to each news article, screenshots gallery, or chatty post. The comment system is moderated by a group of volunteers known as "Shackmods" under the direction of head moderator Jeff "Geedeck" Gondek.

funk.y
funk.y was the first comment system, built by Andy Hanson, used on Shacknews. Comments could be viewed in flat mode or threaded mode, depending on user options. The comments could also be tagged by moderators and "nuked" if they went against the guidelines. A nuked comment would be replaced by the words "* N U K E D *", and the original poster's name would be replaced by an admin account called Duke Nuked.

ja.zz

The second major version of the Shacknews comment system, named ja.zz, was used until June 2007. Essentially a threaded message board, ja.zz was a unique message board written by Sander Pilon for Shacknews. Posts could be moderated into one of many categories, which allowed users to filter what categories could be seen. Comments could also be viewed in several ways: flat, threaded, or dthread (Dynamic thread) mode, which was the most advanced and quickly became the most popular view for the users.

laryn.x
The latest version of Shacknews comment system was released on June 18, 2007. The system is said to be a mix of PHP and MySQL running on the popular Apache HTTP Server. The new system goes by the name "Laryn.x," clearly a play on larynx, commonly known as the human voicebox. The design team was Mike "haiku" Kane on design, John "pup" Brooks on HTML and CSS, Jack Mathews and Shane "wtf242" Sherman programming, and Steve Gibson leading the team.

Mascot
Since 2019, the website has made their mascot a Pomeranian, after one of the editors named "Lola the Pom" who is an actual Pomeranian.

References

External links

Video game news websites
Internet properties established in 1996